Tor Nymo (born 3 July 1940 in Målselv) is a Norwegian politician for the Centre Party.

He was elected to the Norwegian Parliament from Troms in 1993, and was re-elected on one occasion. On the local level, Nymo was a member of the executive committee of Målselv municipality council from 1991 to 1993.

When not involved in politics, Nymo was a farmer and soldier, having served in the United Nations Emergency Force on the Gaza Strip from 1963–1966. For this he was awarded the UNEF Medal in 1964.

References

1940 births
Living people
People from Målselv
Centre Party (Norway) politicians
Members of the Storting
21st-century Norwegian politicians
20th-century Norwegian politicians